Frea flavosparsa is a species of beetle in the family Cerambycidae. It was described by Per Olof Christopher Aurivillius in 1914 and is known from Tanzania.

References

Endemic fauna of Tanzania
flavosparsa
Beetles described in 1914